Hymenocallis imperialis, common name Big Fatty, is a plant species native to the Mexican states of San Luis Potosí and Hidalgo. It is also cultivated in other regions as an ornamental.

Hymenocallis imperialis is a bulb-forming perennial producing sword-shaped leaves and an umbel of large white or yellow flowers.

References

imperialis
Garden plants
Flora of Mexico
Flora of San Luis Potosí
Flora of Hidalgo (state)
Plants described in 1990